Amanita westii is a species of Amanita found in Florida, Mississippi, and Texas, United States

References

External links

westii
Fungi of North America